August Usai (4 December 1880 Lohusuu Parish, Tartu County – 7 or 8 July 1941 Tartu) was an Estonian educator and politician. He was a member of III Riigikogu.

Following the Soviet occupation of Estonia during World War II, Usai was arrested on 27 June 1941 by the NKVD and convicted under § 58-4, 58-10 of the Russian SFNV Criminal Code (anti-Soviet agitation) and killed as a victim of the NKVD prisoner massacre in Tartu on 8 July 1941 in Tartu Prison.

References

1880 births
1941 deaths
Estonian schoolteachers
Members of the Riigikogu, 1926–1929
Members of the Riigikogu, 1929–1932
Members of the Riigikogu, 1932–1934
Estonian military personnel of the Estonian War of Independence
Estonian people executed by the Soviet Union
Estonian prisoners and detainees
Estonian murder victims
Estonian people who died in prison custody
People from Mustvee Parish